Peter Koncilia (born 22 July 1949) is an Austrian footballer. He played in six matches for the Austria national football team from 1975 to 1977. His elder brother Friedl was their country's regular goalkeeper for over a decade.

References

External links
 

1949 births
Living people
Austrian footballers
Austria international footballers
Association football midfielders
FC Wacker Innsbruck players
Sportspeople from Klagenfurt
Footballers from Carinthia (state)
OFI Crete F.C. players
WSG Tirol players
Austrian expatriate sportspeople in Greece
Austrian expatriate footballers
Expatriate footballers in Greece